Bidens bigelovii (Bigelow's beggarticks) is a North American species of flowering plant in the family Asteraceae. It is native to the southwestern and south-central United States (Arizona, New Mexico, Texas, Oklahoma, Colorado) and to Mexico as far south as Oaxaca.

Bidens bigelovii is an annual  herb up to 80 cm (32 inches) tall. It sometimes produces only one flower head at a time, sometimes several, with both yellow disc florets and white ray florets. The species grows along streambanks and in other wet sites.

References

External links

bigelovii
Flora of North America
Plants described in 1859